Aakhri Badla is a 1989 Indian Hindi-language film directed by Mangal Chakraborty. It stars Mithun Chakraborty in lead role, along with Yogeeta Bali, Pradeep Kumar, Prem Chopra in supporting roles. Aakhri Badla is also dubbed in Bengali as "Swarna Trishna", released in 1990.

Summary
Kama Kazi is an international smuggling gang. When the Interpol is about to raid the gang, they moves all their wealth in the form of gold and silver diamonds by ship, but the ship sinks into a cyclone. An Indian company is subcontracted to salvage the sunken ship, and the Indian Intelligence sends its ace agent Himadri Choudhari, and his sidekick Mantu Ghosh along with a Japanese karate master Kitahara.

Cast
 Mithun Chakraborty as Himadri Chaudhary
 Yogeeta Bali as Leena Saigal
 Pradeep Kumar as Preetam Saigal
 Prem Chopra
 Abhi Bhattacharya as Kama Kazi / Dr. Sen

Soundtrack
Lyrics: Yogesh

"Mann Kare Yaad Woh Din" - Kishore Kumar
"Jaane Kaisa Jaadoo Yeh Chal Gaya" - Asha Bhosle
"O Mere Saathi Re" - Kishore Kumar, Lata Mangeshkar
"Sura Sa Towa" - Teresa Ben

References

External links
 
 https://web.archive.org/web/20110415053556/http://www.bollywoodhungama.com/movies/cast/5386/index.html
  -
 https://web.archive.org/web/20120402122055/http://www.theindiabazaar.com/images/P/aakhribadla_mvcd_246x250.jpg

1989 films
1980s Hindi-language films
Indian action drama films
Films scored by Salil Chowdhury
1989 action films